Fegley is an unincorporated community in Adair County, in the U.S. state of Missouri.

History
A post office called Fegley was established in 1899, and remained in operation until 1907. The community was named after Avid Fegley, an early settler.

References

Unincorporated communities in Adair County, Missouri
1899 establishments in Missouri
Unincorporated communities in Missouri